Egypt–Ukraine relations refer to bilateral relations between Egypt and Ukraine. Both countries established foreign relations in 1992. Since 1993, Egypt has an embassy in Kyiv. Since 1993, Ukraine has an embassy in Cairo and an honorary consulate in Alexandria.

See also 
 Foreign relations of Egypt
 Foreign relations of Ukraine

External links 
 Ukrainian embassy in Cairo
 Egyptian embassy in Kyiv

 

 
Ukraine
Egypt